Calpain-3 is a protein that in humans is encoded by the CAPN3 gene.

Function 

Calpain, a heterodimer consisting of a large and a small subunit, is a major intracellular protease, although its function has not been well established. This gene encodes a muscle-specific member of the calpain large subunit family that specifically binds to titin. Mutations in this gene are associated with limb-girdle muscular dystrophies type 2A. Alternate promoters and alternative splicing result in multiple transcript variants encoding different isoforms and some variants are ubiquitously expressed.

In melanocytic cells CAPN3 gene expression may be regulated by MITF.

Interactions 

CAPN3 has been shown to interact with Titin.

References

Further reading

External links 
 The MEROPS online database for peptidases and their inhibitors: C02.004
 GeneReviews/NCBI/NIH/UW entry on Calpainopathy
 LOVD mutation database: CAPN3
 

EF-hand-containing proteins